The  is a commuter electric multiple unit (EMU) train type operated by the private railway operator Hankyu Corporation on Hankyu Kyoto Main Line services since March 2014.

Overview
Based on the 9000 series and 9300 series EMUs first introduced in 2003, the 8-car 1300 series trains are manufactured by Hitachi and have aluminium alloy bodies with a double-skin construction. Externally, the trains are finished in the standard Hankyu colour scheme of all-over maroon.

Formation
The eight-car trains are formed as shown below, with four motored (M) cars and four non-powered trailer (T) cars, and car 1 at the Umeda end.

The "M" cars (1800 and 1850) each have two single-arm pantographs.

Interior
Passenger accommodation consists of longitudinal bench seating throughout, with "golden olive" coloured moquette seat covers. Internally, the trains use LED lighting throughout. Each car includes a wheelchair space at one end.

History
The first set, 1300, entered revenue service from 30 March 2014.

, a fourteenth set is undergoing testing.

Fleet history
The fleet history is as shown below.

See also
 Hankyu 1000 series, a similar variant used on the Kobe/Takarazuka Lines from November 2013

References

External links

 Hankyu 1000/1300 series 

Electric multiple units of Japan
1300 series
Hitachi multiple units
Train-related introductions in 2014
1500 V DC multiple units of Japan